The Kern Canyon slender salamander (Batrachoseps simatus) is a plethodontid salamander.

Distribution
The Kern Canyon slender salamander is endemic to California, in Kern County in the western United States.

This salamander is endemic to and only found in the forested regions of the southern Sierra Nevada south of the Lower Kern River. Much of the salamander's habitat is in the Sequoia National Forest between Bakersfield and Lake Isabella.

Description
The Kern Canyon slender salamander is dark brown in color with bronze and reddish spots covering its 2-inch length. Like other plethodontids it lacks lungs and breathes through its skin, which it must keep moist. It lives in damp leaf litter and emerges during high humidity or rain, and stays dormant in underground holes and crevices during the dry season.  It is similar to the Tehachapi slender salamander.

Conservation
Batrachoseps simatus is considered a California endangered species, and is an IUCN Red List Vulnerable species. The United States Fish and Wildlife Service has petitioned to list the Batrachoseps robustus, Batrachoseps simatus, and Batrachoseps relictus as a threatened species.

References
California Department of Fish and Game 1987

External links
IUCN Red List treatment: Batrachoseps simatus — Kern Canyon slender salamander
IUCN: all species searchpage

Batrachoseps
Salamander
Salamander
Fauna of the Sierra Nevada (United States)
Natural history of Kern County, California
Natural history of Tulare County, California
Sequoia National Park
Amphibians described in 1968